Elmer Dewey was an actor in silent films. He was also known as Dan Danilo.

Filmography
Girls Don't Gamble (1921) as Stanley Marr
Bring Him In (1921) as Baptiste
Taking Chances (1922) as José Borquez
The Escape (1926) as Silas Peele
Shadows of Chinatown (1926)
Million Dollar Mystery (1927) as Boris Orloff
The Charge of the Gauchos (1928) as French

References

Year of birth missing
Year of death missing
American male silent film actors
20th-century American male actors